Kong Portuguese castle is a historical castle located in Bandar Lengeh County in Hormozgan Province, The longevity of this fortress dates back to the Safavid dynasty.

References 

Castles in Iran